Liua is a genus of salamanders (common name: Sichuan salamanders) in the family Hynobiidae, endemic to China.

Species
The genus contains only two species:
 Liua shihi (Liu, 1950) — Wushan salamander (synonym: Ranodon shihi)
 Liua tsinpaensis (Liu and Hu, 1966) — Tsinpa salamander (synonym: Ranodon tsinpaensis)

References

External links
Caudata Culture 2009. Hynobiidae.

Asiatic salamanders
Amphibians of Asia
Endemic fauna of China
Amphibian genera
Taxa named by Zhao Ermi